Samsa (Turkmen: somsa) is a savoury pastry in Central Asian cuisines. It represents a bun stuffed with meat and sometimes with vegetables.

In the countries of Kazakhstan, Kyrgyzstan, Tajikistan, Turkmenistan, Uzbekistan, as well as in the Xinjiang Uygur Autonomous Region of China, samsas are almost always baked. In contrast to South Asian samosas they are rarely fried. The traditional samsa is often baked in the tandoor, which is a special clay oven. The dough can be a simple bread dough or a layered pastry dough. The most common filling for traditional samsa is a mixture of minced lamb and onions, but chicken, minced beef and cheese varieties are also quite common from street vendors. Samsas with other fillings, such as potato or pumpkin (usually only when in season), can also be found.

In Central Asia, samsas are often sold on the streets as a hot snack. They are sold at kiosks, where only samsas are made, or alternatively, at kiosks where other fast foods (such as hamburgers and borscht) are sold. Many grocery stores also buy samsas from suppliers and resell them.

Some related or similar dishes include the deep fried Indian snack with a similar name, the samosa.

Gallery

See also 

 Chebureki
Christmas pie
 Empanada
 Kibinai
 Meat pie
 Öçpoçmaq
 Pasty
 Speķrauši
 Turnover
 List of stuffed dishes

References 

Bashkir cuisine
Crimean cuisine
Kazakhstani cuisine
Kyrgyz cuisine
Russian cuisine
Savoury pies
Stuffed dishes
Tajik cuisine
Tatar cuisine
Turkmenistan cuisine
Uyghur cuisine
Uzbek dishes
Street food
Baked goods
Snack foods
Central Asian cuisine